The 385th Infantry Regiment was part of the 76th Infantry Division of the US Army during World War II and fought in Germany, including the Siegfried Line.
The 385th's 2nd Battalion crossed the Nims River at Niederweis taking the town while the 1st Battalion attacked south between Nims and the Prum toward Irrel.   3rd Battalion was the first of the regiment to span the Sauer and go into action in Germany.  The first days of combat were a series of pillboxes and prepared defenses until the Line had been breached and the Regiment began moving at an ever accelerated speed.

Lineage
Constituted 5 September 1918 in the National Army (USA) as the 385th Infantry and assigned to the 97th Division
 Demobilized 30 November 1918.
 Reconstituted 24 June 1921 in the Organized Reserves as the 385th Infantry and assigned to the 76th Division, (later redesignated as the 76th Infantry Division).
 Organized in December 1921 with headquarters at Providence, Rhode Island.
 Ordered into active military service 15 June 1942 and reorganized at Fort George G. Meade, Maryland.
 Disbanded 31 August 1945 in Germany.
 Reconstituted 7 October 1946 in the Organized Reserves as the 385th Infantry and assigned to the 76th Infantry Division.
 Activated 17 December 1946 with headquarters at Providence, Rhode Island,
(Organized Reserves redesignated 25 March 1948 as the Organized Reserve Corps; redesignated 9 July 1952 as the Army Reserve).
 Reorganized and redesignated 1 May 1959 as the 385th Regiment, an element of the 76th Division (Training), with headquarters at Providence, Rhode Island.
 (Location of headquarters changed 1 April 1960 to Warwick, Rhode Island).
 Reorganized 31 January 1968 to consist of the 1st, 2d, and 3d Battalions, elements of the 76th Division (Training).
 Reorganized 1 October 1994 to consist of the 1st, 2d, and 3d Battalions, elements of the 76th Division (Institutional Training).
 Reorganized 16 October - 16 November 1996 to consist of the 1st, 2d, and 3d Battalions, elements of the 98th Infantry Division (Institutional Training).
 Deactivated in June, 2017 due to restructuring of the Army Reserve.

Honors
WWII Campaign Participation Credit
Rhineland; Ardennes-Alsace; Central Europe

Notable members
PVT Audie Murphy, future Medal of Honor recipient

Distinctive unit insignia
Description

Symbolism
The hat is of the type worn by Roger Williams, founder of Rhode Island, transfixed by an Indian arrow.

Background
The distinctive unit insignia was originally approved for the 385th Infantry, Organized Reserves on 9 August 1924. It was redesignated for the 385th Regiment (BCT), Army Reserve on 15 June 1960. The insignia was amended to revise the description of the design on 11 June 1970

Coat of arms
Blazon
Shield: Azure, a bend Argent, overall in pale an anchor Or, that portion on the bend fimbriated of the first.
Crest: From a wreath Argent and Azure, a felt hat of the Puritan period Proper (Black hat, White band and Gold buckle) transfixed fessways by an Indian arrow Gules armed Or.
Motto: FOLLOW ME
Symbolism
Shield: The shield is blue and white representing Infantry, the previous unit designation, and displays the Rhode Island anchor.
Crest: The crest is a hat of the type worn by Roger Williams, the founder of Rhode Island, transfixed by an Indian arrow.
Background: The coat of arms was originally approved for the 385th Infantry, Organized Reserves on 4 August 1924. It was amended to change the wording of the blazon on 10 February 1928. The coat of arms was redesignated for the 385th Regiment (BCT), Army Reserve, on 15 June 1960.

Publication after hostilities ended
385th At Ease 29 May 1945 Edition

385th At Ease 3 July 1945 Edition

See also
SS Sea Owl

References

"We Ripened Fast - The unofficial History of the Seventy-Sixth Infantry Division", Published by 1st Lt. Joseph J. Hutnick, ADC, Germany 1946
385th in the ETO,  Prepared by the Special Service Office 385th Infantry, 76th Division under the direction of 1st Lt. C. W. Miller, Special service Officer.  Edited by Bill Laubenstein.  Printed in Zwickau, Germany.

External links
http://www.history.army.mil/html/forcestruc/lineages/branches/regt/0385rgt.htm Army History page

385
Military in Connecticut